A by-election was held in the Nanumaga constituency in Tuvalu on 14 January 2014. It followed the seat being declared vacant because of the ill-health of the incumbent Opposition MP Dr. Falesa Pitoi, on health grounds.

Context
Dr. Pitoi, a dentist, had served as one of the two MPs for Nanumaga since 2006, and had been appointed Minister for Education, Youth and Sport in Prime Minister Willy Telavi's government on 24 December 2010. In January 2013, he was taken seriously ill while on an official visit to Cuba. He was hospitalised, and later travelled to New Zealand for further treatment. His prolonged absence from Parliament contributed to the Telavi government losing its parliamentary majority; Pitoi and the rest of Cabinet were voted out of office by Parliament on 2 August. Though still absent from the country, Pitoi was now officially an Opposition MP to the new government led by Prime Minister Enele Sopoaga.

In December 2013, Governor-General Sir Iakoba Italeli declared Pitoi's seat vacant in accordance with Section 99 (2) of the Tuvalu Constitution following a medical report on his health; he had now been away from the country for eleven months. Consequently, a by-election was announced to replace him. Monise Laafai retained the other Nanumaga seat, for which he had been elected in 2010.

The Sopoaga government hoped to win Pitoi's vacant seat from the Opposition, which would grant the government a two thirds majority in Parliament, and enable it in particular to elect a new Speaker, replacing Sir Kamuta Latasi, whom Sopoaga accused of being partisan.

Candidates
Three candidates stood in the by-election: former Speaker, former deputy Prime Minister and former MP for Nanumaga Otinielu Tausi; Halo Tuavai, also a former Nanumaga MP; and Pai Teatu.

Result and consequences
The by-election for the vacancy in the Nanumaga electorate occurred on 14 January 2014. Otinielu Tausi was the successful candidate. He did not immediately announce whether he supported the government or opposition, but eventually opted to join Prime Minister Enele Sopoaga's parliamentary majority, providing the Prime Minister with a two thirds majority in the Parliament. On 4 March 2014, Tausi was elected Speaker.

2010 result

References

2014 elections in Oceania
2014 in Tuvalu
By-elections to the Parliament of Tuvalu
Non-partisan elections